"Playing with the Boys" is a song by American singer-songwriter Kenny Loggins for the film Top Gun, featured in the beach volleyball scene toward the middle of the film prior to Maverick's (Tom Cruise) dinner date with Charlie (Kelly McGillis). It is available on both the original 1986 Top Gun soundtrack album and the 2000 expanded edition. The song peaked at No. 60 on the Billboard hot 100. Loggins re-recorded the song in 2021 featuring Butterfly Boucher.

Reception
Per Loggins's memoir, the song was a hit among gay nightclubs. Spin magazine's interviewer Jonathan Cohen called it "a sort of gay anthem".

Music video
Loggins performs the song in the middle of the men vs. women indoor volleyball game. In the end, the women won by 15–13.

In other media
This song was used for scenes in the 1990 beach volleyball film Side Out, starring C. Thomas Howell, Peter Horton and Courtney Thorne-Smith.

The song was later used in the season 5 American Dad! episode "Phantom of the Telethon", in which Greg and Terry stage a recreation of the volleyball scene from Top Gun, their favorite movie. The song was also used in the season 7 Hawaii Five-0 episode "Poniu I Ke Aloha (Crazy in Love)", where Steve, Danny and their girlfriends play volleyball, also in a similar manner to the Top Gun beach volleyball scene. 

In the season nine episode of It's Always Sunny in Philadelphia, "The Gang Makes Lethal Weapon 6", the song is featured in a parody of the Top Gun scene in which Dennis and Mac, playing Martin Riggs and Roger Murtagh, play volleyball against two shirtless bodybuilders. In 2018, the song was used in the Family Guy episode "Veteran Guy." In 2019, the song was used as title music for Rocket League for its 1980s-themed "Radical Summer" update, but was shortly replaced by a remix of the song by Monstercat production duo Half an Orange that fit the game's existing soundtrack.

Personnel
Kenny Loggins – vocals, acoustic guitar, guitar solo
Nathan East – bass
Steve Wood – synthesizer

References

External links
 

1986 singles
Kenny Loggins songs
Songs written by Kenny Loggins
Songs from Top Gun
Songs written by Peter Wolf (producer)
Columbia Records singles